Matheus Victor de Araujo Rocha (born 27 December 1998), commonly known as Matheus Rocha, is a Brazilian footballer who currently plays as a right back for Oeste.

Career statistics

Club

Notes

References

1998 births
Living people
Brazilian footballers
Association football defenders
Campeonato Brasileiro Série B players
Sport Club do Recife players
Sociedade Esportiva Palmeiras players
Esporte Clube Vitória players
Sportspeople from Piauí